The following balls were used in the UEFA European Championship over the years:

See also
 List of FIFA World Cup official match balls
 List of Copa América official match balls
 List of Africa Cup of Nations official match balls
 List of AFC Asian Cup official match balls
 List of Olympic Football official match balls

References

External links
The History of the Official European Championship Match Balls at soccerball.com